Cabbagetown may refer to:

 Cabbagetown, Toronto, Ontario, Canada
 Cabbagetown, Atlanta, Georgia, United States
 Waterloo Mills Historic District, known as Cabbage Town, in Chester County, Pennsylvania